Kadathu is a 1981 Indian Malayalam film, directed by P. G. Vishwambharan. The film stars Prem Nazir, Shankar, M. G. Soman and Roja Ramani in the lead roles. The film has musical score by Shyam. Actually, the script was penned by Priyadharshan. When the movie screened in the theaters, he noticed the credit had gone to the director himself.

Cast
Prem Nazir as Gopinath
Shankar as Rajappan
M. G. Soman as Ravi
Roja Ramani as Maalu
Sumalatha as Thulasi
Jagathy Sreekumar as Meesha Vasu Pilla
Adoor Bhasi as School Head Master
Alummoodan as School Peon Kittu Pilla
Baby Ponnambili
T. G. Ravi as Kaala Dhamu
 Chembarathi Shobana
 K. P. A. C. Azeez Police Officer
 Bheeman Raghu
 Nellikode Bhaskaran
 Poojappura Ravi
 Aryad Gopalakrishnan
 Shubha as Sarala
 Adoor Bhavani
 Beena Kumbalangi

Soundtrack
The music was composed by Shyam and the lyrics were written by Bichu Thirumala.

Trivia
 Priyadarshan approached producer Aroma M Mani with the first ever script he penned which was to be filmed by PG Vishwambharan but it was decided that a newcomer as a script writer would not fare well in the market so screenplay was credited to the director.

References

External links
 

1981 films
1980s Malayalam-language films
Films directed by P. G. Viswambharan